Billy Thompson may refer to:

Billy Thompson (baseball) (1874–1960), American baseball player
Billy Thompson (basketball) (born 1963), American basketball player
Billy Thompson (boxer) (1923–2009), British and European champion lightweight boxer
Billy Thompson (footballer, born 1886) (1886–1933), English footballer
Billy Thompson (gunman) (1845–1897), Old West gunman and gambler
Billy Thompson (ice hockey) (born 1982), Canadian hockey player
Billy Thompson (soccer, born 1968), American soccer player
Billy Thompson (soccer, born 1990), American soccer player
Billy Thompson (American football) (born 1946), American football player

See also
Billy Thomson (disambiguation)
Bill Thompson (disambiguation)
William Thompson (disambiguation)